Dragon Ball is a Japanese manga series, written and illustrated by Akira Toriyama. The story follows the adventures of Son Goku, a child who goes on a lifelong journey beginning with a quest for the seven mystical Dragon Balls. Along the way, he goes through many rigorous martial arts training regimens and educational programs, defeats a series of increasingly powerful martial artists, and becomes the top martial artist in the universe.
 
The series was published in individual chapters in the magazine Weekly Shōnen Jump. These chapters were collected by Shueisha in a series of 42 tankōbon volumes; the first was released on September 10, 1985, while the last one was released on August 4, 1995. In 2002, the manga was re-released in a collection of 34 kanzenban, which included a slightly rewritten ending, new covers, and color artwork from its Weekly Shōnen Jump run. There have also been two anime adaptations, both produced by Toei Animation; the first, also named Dragon Ball, adapted the first sixteen volumes of the manga, while the second is titled Dragon Ball Z and adapted the remaining twenty-six.

The North American distributing company Viz Media has released all 42 volumes in English, with their version of volumes seventeen through forty-two split into a separate series named Dragon Ball Z. Both began being published in March 1998 (with a re-release of the first ten volumes of both parts in 2003); the last volume of the first part was released on August 3, 2004, while the last one of the second part was released on June 6, 2006. The first 120 chapters of Dragon Ball were also released in individual comic book format, with the remaining chapters exclusive to the graphic novel format. In June 2008, Viz began re-releasing both "series" in a wideban format called "Viz Big Edition", which is a collection of three volumes in one. A "Collector's Edition" of volume one including a hardcover was released on November 4, 2008. In June 2013, they began releasing new 3-in-1 volumes of Dragon Ball, utilizing the Japanese kanzenban covers.



Volume list

Re-releases

Kanzenban
{| class="wikitable" 
|-
! No.
! Chapters
! Release date
! ISBN
|-
| <tr style="border-bottom: 3px solid #CCF | 1
| <tr style="border-bottom: 3px solid #CCF | 1-14
| <tr style="border-bottom: 3px solid #CCF | December 4, 2002
| <tr style="border-bottom: 3px solid #CCF | 
|-
| <tr style="border-bottom: 3px solid #CCF | 2
| <tr style="border-bottom: 3px solid #CCF | 15-29
| <tr style="border-bottom: 3px solid #CCF | December 4, 2002
| <tr style="border-bottom: 3px solid #CCF | 
|-
| <tr style="border-bottom: 3px solid #CCF | 3
| <tr style="border-bottom: 3px solid #CCF | 30-44
| <tr style="border-bottom: 3px solid #CCF | December 28, 2002
| <th scope="row" style="text-align: center; font-weight: normal; width: 98%;">
|-
! Colspan="2" | Volume
! Chapters
! Release date
|-
| Rowspan="4" <tr style="border-bottom: 3px solid #CCF | Son Goku Training Arc
| <tr style="border-bottom: 3px solid #CCF | 1
| <tr style="border-bottom: 3px solid #CCF | 1-13
| Rowspan="16" <tr style="border-bottom: 3px solid #CCF | February 4, 2013
|-
| <tr style="border-bottom: 3px solid #CCF | 2
| <tr style="border-bottom: 3px solid #CCF | 14-26
|-
| <tr style="border-bottom: 3px solid #CCF | 3
| <tr style="border-bottom: 3px solid #CCF | 27-40
|-
| <tr style="border-bottom: 3px solid #CCF | 4
| <tr style="border-bottom: 3px solid #CCF | 41-54
|-
| Rowspan="5" <tr style="border-bottom: 3px solid #CCF | Red Ribbon Army Arc
| <tr style="border-bottom: 3px solid #CCF | 1
| <tr style="border-bottom: 3px solid #CCF | 55-66
|-
| <tr style="border-bottom: 3px solid #CCF | 2
| <tr style="border-bottom: 3px solid #CCF | 67-78
|-
| <tr style="border-bottom: 3px solid #CCF | 3
| <tr style="border-bottom: 3px solid #CCF | 79-89
|-
| <tr style="border-bottom: 3px solid #CCF | 4
| <tr style="border-bottom: 3px solid #CCF | 90-100
|-
| <tr style="border-bottom: 3px solid #CCF | 5
| <tr style="border-bottom: 3px solid #CCF | 101-112
|-
| Rowspan="7" <tr style="border-bottom: 3px solid #CCF | Piccolo Daimaō Arc
| <tr style="border-bottom: 3px solid #CCF | 1
| <tr style="border-bottom: 3px solid #CCF | 113-123
|-
| <tr style="border-bottom: 3px solid #CCF | 2
| <tr style="border-bottom: 3px solid #CCF | 124-134
|-
| <tr style="border-bottom: 3px solid #CCF | 3
| <tr style="border-bottom: 3px solid #CCF | 135-146
|-
| <tr style="border-bottom: 3px solid #CCF | 4
| <tr style="border-bottom: 3px solid #CCF | 147-158
|-
| <tr style="border-bottom: 3px solid #CCF | 5
| <tr style="border-bottom: 3px solid #CCF | 159-170
|-
| <tr style="border-bottom: 3px solid #CCF | 6
| <tr style="border-bottom: 3px solid #CCF | 171-182
|-
| <tr style="border-bottom: 3px solid #CCF | 7
| <tr style="border-bottom: 3px solid #CCF | 183-194
|}

Full color
{| class="wikitable" 
|-
! Colspan="2" | Volume
! Chapters
! Release date
! ISBN
|-
| Rowspan="8" <tr style="border-bottom: 3px solid #CCF | Boyhood Arc
| <tr style="border-bottom: 3px solid #CCF | 1
| <tr style="border-bottom: 3px solid #CCF | 1-16
| <tr style="border-bottom: 3px solid #CCF | January 4, 2016
| <tr style="border-bottom: 3px solid #CCF | 
|-
| <tr style="border-bottom: 3px solid #CCF | 2
| <tr style="border-bottom: 3px solid #CCF | 17-33
| <tr style="border-bottom: 3px solid #CCF | January 4, 2016
| <tr style="border-bottom: 3px solid #CCF | 
|-
| <tr style="border-bottom: 3px solid #CCF | 3
| <tr style="border-bottom: 3px solid #CCF | 34-50
| <tr style="border-bottom: 3px solid #CCF | January 4, 2016
| <tr style="border-bottom: 3px solid #CCF | 
|-
| <tr style="border-bottom: 3px solid #CCF | 4
| <tr style="border-bottom: 3px solid #CCF | 51-57
| <tr style="border-bottom: 3px solid #CCF | January 4, 2016
| <tr style="border-bottom: 3px solid #CCF | 
|-
| <tr style="border-bottom: 3px solid #CCF | 5
| <tr style="border-bottom: 3px solid #CCF | 58-84
| <tr style="border-bottom: 3px solid #CCF | February 5, 2016
| <tr style="border-bottom: 3px solid #CCF | 
|-
| <tr style="border-bottom: 3px solid #CCF | 6
| <tr style="border-bottom: 3px solid #CCF | 85-101
| <tr style="border-bottom: 3px solid #CCF | February 5, 2016
| <tr style="border-bottom: 3px solid #CCF | 
|-
| <tr style="border-bottom: 3px solid #CCF | 7
| <tr style="border-bottom: 3px solid #CCF | 102-117
| <tr style="border-bottom: 3px solid #CCF | February 5, 2016
| <tr style="border-bottom: 3px solid #CCF | 
|-
| <tr style="border-bottom: 3px solid #CCF | 8
| <tr style="border-bottom: 3px solid #CCF | 118-134
| <tr style="border-bottom: 3px solid #CCF | February 5, 2016
| <tr style="border-bottom: 3px solid #CCF | 
|-
| Rowspan="4" <tr style="border-bottom: 3px solid #CCF | Piccolo Daimaō Arc
| <tr style="border-bottom: 3px solid #CCF | 1
| <tr style="border-bottom: 3px solid #CCF | 135-149
| <tr style="border-bottom: 3px solid #CCF | March 5, 2016
| <tr style="border-bottom: 3px solid #CCF | 
|-
| <tr style="border-bottom: 3px solid #CCF | 2
| <tr style="border-bottom: 3px solid #CCF | 150-164
| <tr style="border-bottom: 3px solid #CCF | March 5, 2016
| <tr style="border-bottom: 3px solid #CCF | 
|-
| <tr style="border-bottom: 3px solid #CCF | 3
| <tr style="border-bottom: 3px solid #CCF | 165-179
| <tr style="border-bottom: 3px solid #CCF | March 5, 2016
| <tr style="border-bottom: 3px solid #CCF | 
|-
| <tr style="border-bottom: 3px solid #CCF | 4
| <tr style="border-bottom: 3px solid #CCF | 180-194
| <tr style="border-bottom: 3px solid #CCF | March 5, 2016
| <tr style="border-bottom: 3px solid #CCF | 
|}

Notes

References

Chapters 1